Lucas Krull (born July 11, 1998) is an American football tight end for the New Orleans Saints of the National Football League (NFL). He played college football at Florida before transferring to Pittsburgh.

Early Years
Krull grew up in Shawnee, Kansas and played high school football at Mill Valley High School.

College Career
Krull played junior college football for Jefferson College for one year before committing to Florida. He played there between 2018 and 2020 before transferring again to Pittsburgh.

Professional Career
After going unselected in the 2022 NFL Draft, Krull was signed by the New Orleans Saints as an undrafted free agent. He was released during the final roster cuts, but afterwards was brought back as a member of the practice squad. Krull was elevated to the active roster on December 5, for the Saints' game with the Tampa Bay Buccaneers, and made his NFL debut in the match, appearing on 11 snaps. He signed a reserve/future contract on January 9, 2023.

References 

1998 births
Living people
American football tight ends
Florida Gators football players
Pittsburgh Panthers football players
New Orleans Saints players